Samuel Harrison Mattis (born March 19, 1994) is an American track and field athlete who competes in the discus throw and has a personal record of 68.69 meters. His biggest success to date was first place at the 2015 NCAA National Championships. That was, until he finished first place at the 2019 Outdoor USA Track and Field Championships. In June 2021, Sam became an Olympian after finishing top three at the 2020 United States Track and Field Olympic Trials.

He competed for the University of Pennsylvania Quakers in college and won an NCAA title while there.

He was enrolled in the Wharton School of Business at the University of Pennsylvania pursuing a Bachelor of Science in Finance and Operations Management.

Early life and career
Mattis was born in Manhattan, New York City, the son of Marlon and Marcie Mattis. Mattis grew up in East Brunswick, New Jersey and attended East Brunswick High School, where he started competing in the discus throw events as a teenager.

Collegiate career
Over the course of his four years competing for Penn, he earned three NCAA All-American honors and one NCAA title, as well as being named the USATFCCA/NCAA National Scholar of the year. The U.S. Track & Field and Cross Country Coaches Association selected him as the 2015 Male Scholar Athlete of the Year for Division I. He is a four-time Heps Outdoor Champion in the Discus throw and received First-Team All-Ivy honors for each of his four outdoor seasons.

Personal life
Son of Marcie and Marlon. Has one brother, Jake who also attended UPenn's Wharton School. Father was captain of the William & Mary track & field team in 1985 and held the 35-lbs weight throw record and ranks No. 3 in the hammer.

Major competition record

Personal bests

Information taken from World Athletics and Direct Athletics profiles.

References

External links

 Direct Athletics profile for Sam Mattis

1994 births
Living people
Track and field athletes from New Jersey
East Brunswick High School alumni
People from East Brunswick, New Jersey
Sportspeople from Middlesex County, New Jersey
American male discus throwers
American male shot putters
African-American male track and field athletes
African-American Jews
Wharton School of the University of Pennsylvania alumni
Penn Quakers men's track and field athletes
USA Outdoor Track and Field Championships winners
Athletes (track and field) at the 2020 Summer Olympics
Olympic track and field athletes of the United States
21st-century African-American sportspeople